Princess Constance de Salm (7 September 1767 – 13 April 1845) was a French poet and miscellaneous writer. She wrote a series of poetical "Epistles", one "To Women", another "On the Blindness of this Age". She also wrote, My Threescore Years (1833); The Twenty-Four Hours of a Sensible Woman; and Cantata on the Marriage of Napoleon. Through her second marriage, she became Princess of Salm-Reifferscheid-Dyck. Salm was "the first woman to be admitted to the Lyceum des Arts".

Early years
Constance-Marie de Théis was born in Nantes on 7 September 1767. She was baptized in the parish of Saint-Similien. Her father, Marie-Alexandre de Theis, was a poet who also wrote comedies. During her childhood, her father retired and family moved to Picardy, the family seat, where she received a "brilliant education". At the age of fifteen, she spoke several languages, and learned musical composition. She also took an early interest in literature, especially poetry.

Career
In 1789, she married Jean-Baptiste Pipelet de Leury, a surgeon, whose father had been ennobled by a charge of the king, and established herself in Paris, where various pieces of her writing were published in the Almanac des Muses and other periodicals. 

In 1794, the theater of the Rue de Louvois performed her, Sapho, tragedie melee de chants, a lyric tragedy in three acts and in verse, with music by Jean-Paul-Égide Martini. This piece, which was preceded by a precise description of the life of Sappho, was quite successful, with more than a hundred performances. She dedicated it to her father, whom died in 1796. She continued to provide fugitive pieces to newspapers and collections. She soon found a place for herself in the top rank of women poets, after writing a series of poems, which she styled as "Epitres" (Epistles), the first of which, in 1797 was "Epitre aux femmes", (Epistle to Women) and the most notable, "Epitre surl'aveuglementdu siecle" (On the Blindness of this Age). Others included "Messoixanto ana" (1833), "Les vingt-quatre heures d'une femme sensible", "Pensdes", and "Cantate sur le manage de Napoleon". Poetical "Epistles", "Dramas", and various other productions in verse, read by Pipelet at the Athenaeum at Paris, and afterwards published, obtained for her an honorable reputation in the literary world. She also published several ballads, of which she composed the melodies and the piano accompaniments. 

Salm divorced in 1799. She wrote about it in a piece entitled "le Divorce, ou Conseils dune Mère a sa Fille" (Divorce, or Advice from a Mother to her Daughter). In 1800, the drama, Camille, ou Amitié et imprudence, was withdrawn by Salm after its first performance because of a poor reception, and she did not write for the stage again.

In 1803, she married Count Joseph zu Salm-Reifferscheidt-Dyck, who took the title of prince in 1816. After this marriage, Salm published as the Princesse de Salm.
She lived alternately on the estates of her husband, in Germany, and at Paris, where, by her wit, her conversational powers, and her amiable manners, she rallied round her the elite of artists, and people of letters. The numerous productions of Salm were printed under the title, Poésies de la princesse Constance de Salm (Poems of the Princess Constance of Salm) in Paris by Didot, in 1811 and a more comprehensive edition in 1817. Salm's poetic works are distinguished by a firm and frank pace, by force of thought, philosophical spirit, and by the habit of using the proper word, which contributes to rendering her style as clear, natural and energetic, without taking away elegance and grace. In June 1833, Salm published, Mes Soixante ans, ou Mes Souvenirs politiques et litteraires (My Sixty Years, or My Political and Literary Memories) (Paris, Bertrand, Didot). Although praised by several newspapers, this work was considered to be mediocre.

Salm died in Paris on 13 April 1845.

References

Authority control

Bibliography
 Bied, Robert, «Le Rôle d'un salon littéraire au début du 19th century : les amis de Constance de Salm », Revue de l'Institut Napoléon, nº 113, 
 Castil-Cagarriga, G. « Madame la princesse de Salm », Revue des deux mondes, mai-juin 1957, 
 
 Jullian, Philippe, « 150 ans après la Princesse de Salm », Connaissance des arts, juin 1976, 
 Lauzon, Martine, Une moraliste féministe : Constance de Salm, mémoire de maîtrise, Montréal, Université McGill, juillet 1997
 
 
 Pouget-Brunereau, Jeanne, "Presse féminine et critique littéraire [Texte imprimé] : leurs rapports avec l'histoire des femmes de 1800 à 1830", Paris, Bibliothèque Marguerite Durand, 2 vol., 1994, cote 4° 1414 1415, (suite d'une thèse soutenue en 1993), t. 1:  et t. 2: . (Étude de la critique littéraire dans des journaux de presse féminine et de son importance sur l'histoire des femmes pendant les trente premières années du 19th-century, avec Annexes intéressantes). Cette étude a été imprimée en 2000 et se trouve à la BnF mais les Annexes et la Bibliographie ont été écourtées par l'éditeur
 Quérard, J.-M., La France littéraire, Paris, 2nd éd., tome VIII, ;
 Sanson de Pongerville, Jean-Baptiste, « Préface » de son édition des Pensées (V. supra);
 Seth, Catriona, « Les Muses de l'Almanach. La poésie au féminin dans l'Almanach des Muses », Masculin/Féminin dans la poésie et les poétiques du 19th-century, sous la direction de Christine Planté, Lyon, PUL, 2002, ;
 Seth, Catriona, 2010 « La femme auteur: stratégie et paradigmes. Le cas de Constance de Salm», La littérature en Bas-Bleus (éd. Brigitte Louichon & Andrea Del Lungo). Paris, Garnier, 2010, p.195-213
 
 Sullerot, Évelyne, Histoire de la presse féminine, Paris, 1966, 
 Vapereau, G., Dictionnaire universel des littératures, Paris, Hachette, 1876, tome II,

Further reading
 Biographie universelle..., éd. augmentée, 1854–1865, tome 37, 
 Constance de Salm. Cahiers Roucher-André Chénier  - 2010, . Articles de Christine Planté, Catriona Seth, Lesley H. Walker, Jean-Noël Pascal, Michèle Crogiez, Marie-Emmanuelle Plagnol-Diéval, Jérôme Dorival, Geneviève Goubier, Huguette Krief.;    Jean-François Lemaire, Chez Constance de Salm  ("L'objet d'Art", numéro de fin 1987, ill. de photos de Roland Beaufre, pp 84 à 93)
 Grand dictionnaire universel du 19th-century, Paris, 1865–1876, tome XIV, 
 Nouvelle Biographie générale, 1867, tome 43, 

1767 births
1845 deaths
Writers from Nantes
18th-century French poets
18th-century French dramatists and playwrights
18th-century French women writers
19th-century French writers
19th-century French poets
19th-century French dramatists and playwrights
19th-century French women writers
German princesses
Princesses by marriage